Lev Dmitrievich Mukhin (15 October 1936 – 25 April 1977) was a Russian, Soviet heavyweight boxer. He won a silver medal at the 1956 Summer Olympics, losing the final to Pete Rademacher. Rademacher, an upcoming heavyweight champion, would score three knockdowns before the bout was stopped. Coming into the final Mukhin knocked out all his opponents, despite two of them knocked him down in the first round.

Mukhin took up boxing in 1951, and in 1955 won the Soviet title, finishing second at the Soviet championships. He placed second again in 1956 and never competed internationally except for the 1956 Olympics.

1956 Olympic results
Below is the record of Lev Mukhin, a heavyweight boxer from the Soviet union who competed at the 1956 Melbourne Olympics:

 Round of 16: defeated Bozhil Lozanov (Bulgaria) by a third-round knockout
 Quarterfinal: defeated Törner Åhsman (Sweden) by a first-round knockout
 Semifinal: defeated Giacomo Bozzano (Italy) by a third-round knockout
 Final: lost to Pete Rademacher (United States) by a first-round knockout (was awarded silver medal)

References 

1936 births
Soviet male boxers
Honoured Masters of Sport of the USSR
Olympic boxers of the Soviet Union
Boxers at the 1956 Summer Olympics
Olympic silver medalists for the Soviet Union
Spartak athletes
1977 deaths
Olympic medalists in boxing
Russian male boxers
Medalists at the 1956 Summer Olympics
Heavyweight boxers
Sportspeople from Rostov Oblast